(born March 3, 1981 in Sendai) is a former member and sub-leader of Melon Kinenbi, an all-girl J-pop group formerly within Hello! Project.

Biography

Murata passed the second Morning Musume & Michiyo Heike Imōtobun Audition, out of about 4,000 total people to audition. The final four (Hitomi Saito, Murata, Masae Ōtani and Ayumi Shibata) were chosen to form a new Hello! Project group, called Melon Kinenbi. Murata was originally leader of the group at the time of its founding in 1999, until leadership was given to Hitomi Saito in September 2002. Murata participated in a number of shuffle units – 10-nin Matsuri, Odoru 11, 11Water and H.P. All Stars.

For several years her "trademark" within the group was wearing glasses; however, since 2006 she has rarely worn them, saying that the glasses had become "too comfortable" to her – while performing she wears contact lenses, but still wears glasses at home.

In May 2010, Melon Kinenbi officially disbanded. It was announced in June that Murata would remain contracted with Up-Front Agency, the company behind Hello! Project, and pursue a solo career. She also altered her stage name slightly as of July 1, writing it in all-katakana instead. Murata became the first (and to date only) member of Melon Kinenbi to be included on Hello! Project's official list of graduates, as the only member still with Up-Front. Despite this announcement, however, nothing was heard of regarding Murata's solo career, and the last update regarding her career was on May 5, 2011 through a blog entry.

Appearances

Television

Radio

References 

1981 births
Living people
People from Sendai
Japanese idols
Japanese women pop singers
Melon Kinenbi members
Musicians from Miyagi Prefecture